The EHF Champions League 2005–06 was the 2005–2006 edition of the EHF Champions League who is managed by EHF.

Qualification round

Group Matches

Group A

Group B

Group C

Group D

Group E

Group F

Group G

Group H

Round of 16

Quarter-finals

Semi-finals

Final

Top scorers
The top scorers from the 2005–06 EHF Champions League are as follows:

 
C
C
EHF Champions League seasons